Phalaecus was the ruler of Phocis in Greece during the Third Sacred War before he was ousted. After he was ousted he became the leader of a group of mercenaries, whose services were sought by Knossos in Crete. Once in Crete. The leaders of Knossos ordered him to attack their enemy, the city of Lyttus. The Lyttians appealed to the Spartans who came to Crete with an army under their king Archidamus III. As Phalaecus was besieging Lyttus, the Spartans arrived and relieved the siege. Later in 343 BC Phalaecus attacked and laid siege to Kydonia, where he was routed and he lost his life.

Sources
 Theocharis Detorakis, (1994). A History of Crete. Heraklion: Heraklion. .

4th-century BC Greek people
343 BC deaths
Ancient Phocian generals
Dorian Crete
Ancient Greek mercenaries
Year of birth unknown